Dioedas was the third known general of the Achaean League in Ancient Greece who served only for a year, 244 – 243 BC.

Ancient Greek generals
3rd-century BC Greek people
Achaean League